Khol De Meri Zuban  is a 1989 Bollywood film directed by Dada Kondke and starring Dada Kondke, Bandini Mishra, Mehmood, Viju Khote, Satish Shah and Ratan Mala.

Soundtrack

References

External links

1980s Hindi-language films
1989 films